Thomas Neal Thobe (born September 3, 1969) is an American former baseball pitcher who played in Major League Baseball for the Atlanta Braves.

Thobe was drafted in the 38th round of the 1987 Major League Baseball draft by the Chicago Cubs out of Edison High School in Huntington Beach, California. He was assigned to the Wytheville Cubs of the Appalachian League to begin his professional career in 1988. After one year in Chicago's farm system, he quit baseball and returned home to Southern California where he entered the workforce. Four years later, as a favor to his mother, he attended a tryout with an Atlanta Braves scout and was signed to a minor league deal. He worked his way through their minor league system and made his Major League debut in 1995.

References

External links

1969 births
Living people
Major League Baseball pitchers
Atlanta Braves players
Baseball players from Kentucky
Sportspeople from Covington, Kentucky
Allentown Ambassadors players
Sonoma County Crushers players
Chattanooga Lookouts players
Greenville Braves players
Macon Braves players
Richmond Braves players
Wytheville Cubs players